The 2009 British Superbike season was the 22nd British Superbike Championship season. It began at Brands Hatch on 13 April, ending at Oulton Park on 11 October after 26 races held in England and Scotland.

None of the top four from the 2008 championship returned, as Shane Byrne, Leon Haslam and Tom Sykes moved into the Superbike World Championship, with Cal Crutchlow leaving for the Supersport World Championship.

Having lost his MotoGP ride, Sylvain Guintoli moved into the championship,  joining the Worx Crescent Suzuki team on a GSX-R1000. HM Plant Honda had an all-new all-Australian line-up, with former World Supersport Championship front-runner Josh Brookes and reigning British Supersport Champion Glen Richards. Reigning champions GSE Racing switched from Ducati to Yamaha, retaining Leon Camier and adding James Ellison to the team. Chris Walker made a return to the championship on a Motorpoint/Henderson Yamaha.

Camier won the title in dominant fashion, winning a series record nineteen races during the season. Team-mate Ellison finished as runner-up with Stuart Easton third. Gary Mason was just as dominant in the Privateers Cup, winning eighteen races en route to the title.

Calendar
 In a twist to the championship, MotorSport Vision announced that two of the rounds would consist of a triple-header meeting, instead of the usual double-header.

Support Races
 Fuchs-Silkolene British Supersport Championship – Champion: Steve Plater
 Focused Events RC8 Super – Champion: Dave Wood
 Metzeler National Superstock 1000 Championship – Champion: Alastair Seeley
 Metzeler National Superstock 600 Championship – Champion: Jamie Hamilton
 Relentless 125 GP British Championship – Champion: James Lodge

Entry List

Season standings

Riders Standings

Privateers Standings

Manufacturers' Standings

References

External links
The official website of the British Superbike Championship

British
British Superbike Championship
Superbike